Cleveland is an unincorporated community located in Mora County, New Mexico, United States. Cleveland has a post office with ZIP code 87715, which opened on August 11, 1892. The town was named after President Grover Cleveland.

References

Unincorporated communities in Mora County, New Mexico
Unincorporated communities in New Mexico